Godefridus Johannes Hoogewerff (1884-1963) was a Dutch art historian.

Life
Born in Amersfoort and studying in that town's gymnasium, from 1903 to 1908 he studied at the University of Utrecht, during which time he catalogued the manuscripts of that city's Aartsbischoppelijk Museum. In 1909 he made his first visit to Rome, basing himself at the Nederlands Historisch Instituut te Rome whilst he researched his doctoral dissertation on Dutch painters working in Italy in the 16th century, supervised by Willem Vogelsang, whose assistant Hoogewerff had become in 1908. He gained his doctorate in 1912 but stayed on at the Instituut, eventually in 1923 becoming its Director.

He also researched Dutch illuminated manuscripts and early Dutch painting and from 1922 to 1925 he and A. W. Byvanck edited the three-volume Noord-Nederlandsche Miniaturen. He also specialised in Jan van Scorel, publishing a French-language monograph on him in 1923 and another in Dutch in 1941. His initial retirement in 1950 did not prevent him becoming Professor in Iconography and Early Christian Art at the University of Utrecht, whilst his second retirement four years later proved the catalyst for his foundation of the Dutch Institute for Art History in Florence, where he had settled and later died.

References

1884 births
1963 deaths
Dutch art historians
People from Amersfoort
Utrecht University alumni
Academic staff of Utrecht University
Members of the Royal Netherlands Academy of Arts and Sciences